Humayun Rasheed Choudhury (11 November 1928 – 10 July 2001) was a Bangladeshi career diplomat and Speaker of the Bangladesh National Parliament from 1996 to 2001. He was elected president of the 41st session of the UN General Assembly in 1986. He was awarded Independence Day Award in 2018 posthumously by the Government of Bangladesh.

Early life and education
Choudhury was born on 11 November 1928, to a Bengali Muslim political family in Sylhet, erstwhile British India. Their ancestral home is in Dargapasha in Sunamganj District. He was the eldest of the seven children of Abdur Rasheed Choudhury (d. 1944) and Begum Serajunnessa Choudhury (1910–1974). Abdur was a member of the Assam Legislative Assembly and later a member of the Central Legislative Assembly in Delhi. Serajunessa was elected a member of Pakistan National Assembly.

Choudhury passed the matriculation exam from Sylhet Government Pilot High School. Later he studied in St. Edmund's College in Shillong. He graduated from Aligarh Muslim University in 1947. He then studied for the English Bar and became a member of the Inner Temple in London. He obtained a diploma in International Affairs from the London Institute of World Affairs. He later graduated from The Fletcher School of Law and Diplomacy in Massachusetts, United States. He gained fluency in Bengali, English, Urdu, French and Italian, and was conversational in Arabic, Spanish, Portuguese, German and Indonesian.

Career
Choudhury joined the Pakistan Foreign Service in 1953. During his diplomatic career with Pakistan, he held various assignments in Rome, Baghdad, Paris, Lisbon, Jakarta and New Delhi. During the Bangladesh Liberation War in 1971, he defected to the Provisional Government of Bangladesh. He negotiated the recognition of Bangladesh by over 40 countries. On Victory Day, 1971, he addressed the Indian parliament on behalf of the Bangladeshi people. He became the first Bangladeshi Ambassador to the Federal Republic of Germany in 1972, with concurrent accreditation to Switzerland, Austria and the Holy See. He was also the first Permanent Representative of Bangladesh to the International Atomic Energy Agency (IAEA) and the United Nations Industrial Development Organization (UNIDO). In 1975, Choudhury sheltered Sheikh Hasina and Sheikh Rehana at his residence in Bonn after the assassination of Sheikh Mujibur Rahman.

In 1976, Choudhury became the first Ambassador of Bangladesh to the Kingdom of Saudi Arabia. He also had concurrent accreditation to Jordan and Oman. During this assignment, he represented Bangladesh in the Organization of the Islamic Conference. He served as the Foreign Secretary of Bangladesh during 1981–1982. He was appointed Ambassador to the United States in June 1982. As a member or leader of his country's delegations, he attended the United Nations General Assembly session; the Islamic Summit Conference held in Taif, Saudi Arabia (1981); the Islamic Foreign Ministers' Conference in Tripoli (1977), Dakar (1978), Fez, Morocco (1979), Islamabad (1980) and Baghdad (1981); the North-South Summit on International Cooperation and Development held in Cancun, Mexico (1981); Meetings of the Islamic Summit-level Peace Committee to resolve disputes between Iran and Iraq; the extraordinary session on Afghanistan of the Islamic Foreign Ministers in Islamabad (1980); and the extraordinary session on Jerusalem of the Islamic Foreign Ministers held in Amman (1980).

He has also led his country's delegations to a number of bilateral meetings including talks with India on border delineation, sharing of Ganges waters, demarcation of the maritime boundary, South Asia Forum (South Asian Regional Co-operation), Bangladesh–Burma border demarcation talks, Bangladesh-Saudi Arabia Joint Economic Talks and others. As Chairman of the fourteenth Islamic Conference of Foreign Ministers (ICFM XIV), he presided over the Co-ordination Meeting of the Foreign Ministers of the Islamic Conference while attending the thirty-ninth session of the United Nations General Assembly. He also led the Bangladesh delegation to the Extraordinary Ministerial Meeting of the non-Aligned Countries on Namibia, held in New Delhi in April 1985, and the Islamic Peace Committee Meeting, held in Jeddah in May 1985. Choudhury was part of the cabinet of President Hossain Mohammad Ershad and a Jatiya Party Member of Parliament during 1986–1990. He was elected member of the National Parliament in 1996 as a nominee of the Bangladesh Awami League and was elected Speaker of the Parliament. He died in Dhaka due to a heart attack on July 10, 2001. He was buried in Shah Jalal Dargah Cemetery in Sylhet.

Awards
 Mahatma Gandhi Peace Prize by the College of William and Mary in Virginia (1984)
 U Thant Peace Award
 Independence Day Award (2018)

Personal life

Humayun Rashid Choudhury was married to Mehjabeen Choudhury (1931-2018). They had a daughter Nasrine R Karim (1949–2010) and a son Nauman Rasheed Choudhury (1950-2017).

References

1928 births
2001 deaths
People from Dakshin Sunamganj Upazila
Aligarh Muslim University alumni
Speakers of the Jatiya Sangsad
International Atomic Energy Agency officials
Presidents of the United Nations General Assembly
Permanent Representatives of Bangladesh to the United Nations
Foreign ministers of Bangladesh
The Fletcher School at Tufts University alumni
Ambassadors of Bangladesh to Switzerland
Ambassadors of Bangladesh to Austria
Ambassadors of Bangladesh to the Holy See
Ambassadors of Bangladesh to West Germany
Ambassadors of Bangladesh to Saudi Arabia
Ambassadors of Bangladesh to Jordan
Ambassadors of Bangladesh to Oman
Ambassadors of Bangladesh to the United States
Awami League politicians
Jatiya Party politicians
Foreign Secretaries of Bangladesh
Recipients of the Independence Day Award
3rd Jatiya Sangsad members
4th Jatiya Sangsad members
7th Jatiya Sangsad members
Sylhet Government Alia Madrasah alumni